Keling is a kecamatan  (district) in Jepara Regency, Central Java, Indonesia.

History
The name of this district is traditionally linked with the 6th century Indianized kingdom of Kalingga, which ultimately derived from ancient Indian kingdom of Kaling.

Kelurahan (administrative village)
 Bumiharjo
 Damarwulan
 Tempur
 Gelang
 Jlegong
 Kaligarang
 Kelet
 Keling
 Klepu
 Kunir
 Tunahan
 Watuaji

Tourism 
 Islamic tomb of Syekh Siti Jenar, di Kelet
 Angin temple, in Tempur
 Bubrah temple, in Tempur
 Beringin Beach, in Bumiharjo
 Blorong Cave, in Damarwulan
 Watu Ombo, in Damarwulan
 Kedung Pancur Telu Waterfall, in Damarwulan
 Curug Kemiri Waterfall, in Damarwulan
 Curug Kyai Buku Waterfall, in Damarwulan
 City of Stone (Kota Batu), in Watuaji

Economy
Keling district is known as a coffee bean plantation and production center in Central Java. In Damarwulan village, there are silk farm home industry, while in Keling village, there is kapok silk cotton production area. There are three marketplaces in Keling district, the Pasar Keling, Pasar Kelet, and Keling animal market.

List of important places 
 Kelet Hospital
 Puskesmas Keling 1, in Kelet
 Puskesmas Keling 2, in Keling

References 

Districts of Central Java